City University (جامعة المدينة), previously known as Al-Manar University of Tripoli (MUT), also known as the Rashid Karami Institution for Higher Education, is a private accredited university located in Tripoli, Lebanon. The university was founded on 15 November 1990 by Presidential Decree No. 720.

History

The City University (CITYU)'s establishment was first proposed in 1985, when the late Prime Minister Rashid Karami collaborated with educator Muhieddin Makkouk and a group of prominent Tripoli citizens on a project to meet the educational concerns of North Lebanon.

In 1986 they formally established the "Al-Manar Society", a non-profit organization dedicated to providing quality education to students of North Lebanon and other regions of the Arab World.

After the assassination of Rashid Karami, Prime Minister Omar Karami assumed the Chairmanship of "Al-Manar Society", and formed the first University Board of Trustees in 1990. The Board was chaired by Karami and involved 18 other members from Lebanon and the Arab World. MUT's current president is Dr. Edgard Rizk.

In 2017, a new presidential decree no. 1908 was published to reflect the university's new educational identity, renaming it City University and changing its name from Al-Manar University of Tripoli.

Faculties

Faculty of Architecture and Design (FAD)
The FAD building has a floor area of 3300 m2 and has a capacity of 550 students.
FAD offers degrees in the following majors:
 Architecture
 Graphic Design
 Interior Design
 Furniture Design
 Photography
 Industrial Design
 Studio Arts

Faculty of Arts & Human Science
The faculty building has a floor area of 1670 m2 and capacity for 420 students.
Faculty of Arts & Human Science offers degrees in the following majors:
 Arabic Language and Literature
 French Language and Literature
 English Language and Literature
 Psychology
 Sociology
 Philosophy
 Elementary Education
 Translation

Faculty of Business Administration
The faculty building has 1570 m2 of floor space and capacity for 400 students.
Faculty of Business  Administration offers degrees in the following majors:
 Management
 Marketing
 Finance
 Accounting
 Economics
 Islamic Banking and Finance
 Management Information System
 Hospitality & Tourism Management

Faculty of Engineering and Information Technology (FEIT)
The Faculty was established in 2007. Currently directed by Dr. Walid Kamali. The faculty building has 2100 m2 of floor space and capacity for 350 students. FEIT offers undergraduate degrees, BSc and Engineering Diplomas in the following majors:

 Electronics and Computer Engineering (ECE)
 Communication and Network Engineering (CNE)
 Industrial Engineering (IE)
 Biomedical Engineering (BME)
 Information Technology (IT)
 Computer Science (CS)
 Civil and Environmental (CIV) 
 Marine Transport and Technology (MTT)
 Marine Engineering and Technology  (MET)

Faculty of Public Health
The building has 2720 m2 of floor space and capacity for 350 students.
This faculty offers degrees in the following majors:
 Nutrition
 Nursing
 Public Health

Faculty of Science
The building has 1800 m2 of floor space and capacity for 300 students.
This faculty offers degrees in the following majors:
 Mathematics
 Biology
 Physics
 Chemistry

Faculty of Agriculture
This faculty was established in 2007.

IEP - Intensive English Program 
The Intensive English Program (IEP) helps students to master English language writing, reading, listening, and grammar skills. Course participation is determined by an English Entrance Exam test (similar to "Triple E"), used to assign students to ability-level classes from Level One to the Level Nine TOEFL Level.

References

External links 
City University Website

1990 establishments in Lebanon
Universities in Lebanon
Educational institutions established in 1990